Macalla mixtalis is a species of snout moth in the genus Macalla. It was described by Francis Walker in 1866. It is found in Honduras.

References

Moths described in 1866
Epipaschiinae